The 2008 Italian Figure Skating Championships was held in Milan from December 20 through 23, 2007. Skaters competed in the disciplines of men's singles, ladies' singles, pair skating, ice dancing, and synchronized skating on the levels of senior and junior, and novice synchronized. The results were used to choose the teams to the 2008 World Championships, the 2008 European Championships, and the 2008 World Junior Championships.

Senior results

Men

Ladies

Pairs

Ice dancing

Synchronized

References

External links
 Official website 
 results

Italian Figure Skating Championships
2007 in figure skating
Italian Figure Skating Championships, 2008
2008 in Italian sport